The Guiana Space Centre (CSG), also called Europe's Spaceport, is a European spaceport to the northwest of Kourou in French Guiana, a region of France in South America. In operation since 1968, it is a suitable location for a spaceport because of its equatorial location and open sea to the east.

The European Space Agency (ESA), the European Union Agency for the Space Programme (EUSPA), the French space agency CNES (National Centre for Space Studies), the Space Agency of the Republic of Azerbaijan (Azercosmos) and the commercial company Arianespace conduct launches from Kourou. It was used by the ESA to send supplies to the International Space Station using the Automated Transfer Vehicle.

History 
In 1964 Guiana was selected to become the spaceport of France, replacing France's first launch site Centre interarmées d'essais d'engins spéciaux in Hammaguir, Algeria. In 1975, France offered to share Kourou with the ESA. Commercial launches are also bought by non-European companies. ESA pays two-thirds of the spaceport's annual budget and has also financed the upgrades made during the development of the Ariane launchers.

On 4 April 2017, the center was occupied by 30 labour unions and indigenous peoples leaders in the midst of the 2017 social unrest in French Guiana, highlighting problems from its colonial heritage, but was taken back on 24 April 2017.

Facilities 

The space centre was built in its current location for many reasons. As the space centre is near the equator, substantially less energy is required to manoeuvre a spacecraft from the spaceport into an equatorial, geostationary orbit. Adjacent to the centre is the open sea to the east, reducing the chance of lower stages of rockets and debris from launch failures falling on or near human habitations. Rockets usually launch to the east to take advantage of the angular momentum provided by Earth's rotation.

The near-equatorial launch location of the Guiana Space Centre is meant to provide an advantage for launches to low-inclination (or geostationary) Earth orbits compared to launches from spaceports at higher latitude. This is because rockets can be launched into orbits with an inclination of as low as ~6°. The lowest inclination a rocket from Cape Canaveral could be launched to is 28.5° (the latitude of Cape Canaveral). Inclination change burns require significant amounts of propellant. Changing inclination by 28.5°  requires significant propellant mass, reducing a rocket's payload capacity when transferring satellites into a geostationary transfer orbit (GTO). As a result of these phenomena, similarly sized Proton and Ariane 5 rockets can send similar payloads to a low Earth orbit (LEO). However, the Proton, launched from high latitudes in Russia, can only send 6,270 kg to GTO while a Kourou-launched Ariane 5 can send more than 10,000 kg to GTO.

BEC / ELA-1 / ELV 

One Europa-II was launched from the site in 1971, which ended in failure due to a guidance problem before the program was cancelled.

The pad at Giunana was demolished and subsequently rebuilt as the first launch complex for Ariane as ELA. Redesignated later as ELA-1, it was used for Ariane 1 and Ariane 2 and 3 launches until being retired in 1989.

In November 2001, it was refurbished again for the Vega rocket and renamed ELV. The first launch was launched on 13 February 2012.

ELA-2 

Before 1988, although purpose-built for Ariane 4, the pad hosted an Ariane-2 and two Ariane-3 launches. The complex consisted of two areas: the launcher preparation zone and the launch pad, separated by one kilometre, allowing a launcher to be assembled in the preparation zone while another launch from the pad. A mobile service tower at the launch pad provided a protected environment for payload installation and final preparation of the rocket. In September 2011 the pad's service tower was demolished using explosives.

ELA-3 

ELA-3 has been active, launching Ariane 5 rockets since 1996.

ELA-4 

CNES was responsible for the construction of the Ariane 6 ground segments including the new launch pad. Earthworks on the 150 hectare launch site began at the end of June 2015 and was completed at the start of 2016. Four platforms were levelled to accommodate the launch pad, the liquid oxygen and hydrogen tanks and the assembly building. Civil engineering works on the flame trench and other buildings began in the summer of 2016 and ended in 2019. The new launch facility was inaugurated on 28 September 2021 with first flight of the Ariane 6 scheduled in 2023.

ELS / Soyuz at CSG 

The first Soyuz launch from ELS was postponed several times, but launched on 21 October 2011.

ELS is located on the territory of Sinnamary commune,  from Kourou harbor. Under the terms of the Russo-European joint venture, ESA will augment its own launch vehicle fleet with Soyuz rockets — using them to launch ESA or commercial payloads — and the Russians will get access to the Kourou spaceport for launching their own payloads with Soyuz rockets. Russia will use the Guiana Space Centre in addition to Baikonur Cosmodrome. The Guiana location has the significant benefit of greatly increased payload capability, owing to the near equatorial position. A Soyuz rocket with a 1.7 tones to geostationary transfer orbit (GTO) performance from Baikonur will increase its payload potential to 2.8 tones from the Guiana launch site.

The ELS project is being co-funded by Arianespace, ESA, and the European Union, with CNES being the prime contractor. The project has a projected cost of approximately €320 million, where €120 million are allocated for modernizing the Soyuz vehicle. The official opening of the launch site construction occurred on 27 February 2007. Excavation work however, had previously begun several months beforehand.

On 13 September 2010, Spaceflight Now reported that after several delays in the construction of a mobile gantry the launch pad had been finished, and the first flight of the Soyuz was expected to occur in early 2011. By October 2010, 18 launch contracts were signed. Arianespace has ordered 24 launchers from Russian industry.

On 21 October 2011, two Galileo IOV-1 and IOV-2 satellites were launched using a Soyuz-ST rocket, in the "first Russian Soyuz vehicle ever launched from Europe's Spaceport in French Guiana.".

Final assembly building 
Astrium assembles each Ariane 5 launcher in the Launcher Integration Building. The vehicle is then delivered to the Final Assembly Building for payload integration by Arianespace. The mobile launch table completes the trip with an Ariane 5 in about one hour. It is then secured in place over the launch pad's flame ducts.

Launches

Launch safety 
Fire safety is ensured by a detachment of the Paris Fire Brigade, a branch of the French Army. Security around the base is ensured by French Gendarmerie forces, assisted by the 3rd Foreign Infantry Regiment of the French Foreign Legion. Before and during launch windows, CSG facility security is significantly enhanced by anti-personnel and anti-aircraft measures, the exact configurations of which are classified by the French military. All entrants to the launch complex are also subject to checks for proof of permission to enter the facility.

The Guiana Space Centre (as per CNES) also contains the Îles du Salut, a former penal colony including the infamous Devil's Island. Now a tourist site, the islands are under the launching trajectory for geosynchronous orbit and have to be evacuated during launches.

Early launches 
 10 March 1970 — The first Diamant-B launched the DIAL/MIKA and DIAL/WIKA satellites. DIAL/MIKA failed during launch, but it entered orbit with a total mass of 111 kg. DIAL/WIKA provided data for about two months after launch.

Recent launches 

 5 October 2007 — An Ariane 5 GS launched from CSG carrying Intelsat 11 and Optus D2.
 9 March 2008 — An Ariane 5 launched carrying the ATV (Automated Transfer Vehicle) Jules Verne in preparation for docking with the International Space Station (ISS). This was the first launch of the ESA unmanned resupply craft.
 18 April 2008 — An Ariane 5 launched carrying Vinasat-1 — Vietnam's first satellite.
 14 August 2008 — An Ariane 5 carrying Superbird 7 for Mitsubishi Electric Corporation and AMC-21 for SES Americom
 20 December 2008 — An Ariane 5 carrying HOT BIRD 9 and W2M for Eutelsat
 14 May 2009 — An Ariane 5 carrying the ESA's Herschel and Planck space telescopes
 1 July 2009 — An Ariane 5 carrying TerreStar-1, the heaviest commercial telecommunications satellite ever launched
 18 December 2009 — An Ariane 5 carrying Helios 2B European military observation satellite used by France, Belgium, Spain and Greece.
 21 May 2011 — 04:38 (GMT+08:00) An Ariane 5 ECA launch vehicle launched carrying ST-2 Satellite twice as powerful Singtel's first satellite ST-1, which was launched back in 1998. It will provide 20% more transponder capacity and a wider coverage footprint than ST-1, with C-band and Ku-band coverage of the Middle East, Central Asia, Indian subcontinent and Southeast Asia.
 21 October 2011 — A Soyuz-2 carrying two Galileo satellites was launched. This was the first launch of a Soyuz rocket at the Centre Spatial Guyanais.
 17 December 2011 — A Soyuz carrying the French space agency's Pleiades 1 Earth imaging satellite, four ELISA electronic intelligence satellites, and the SSOT remote sensing satellite for the Chilean military. This was the second launch of a Soyuz at the Guiana Space Centre.
 13 February 2012 — The Vega, which was designed in Italy, lifted off at 10:00 UTC on its maiden voyage. The launcher released nine satellites into orbit: two Italian satellites and seven pico-satellites.
 5 July 2012 — The unmanned Ariane 5 rocket took off to send an American communication satellite and European weather-monitoring spacecraft into orbit. Liftoff occurred at 21:36 UTC.
 30 August 2013 — Indian Space Research Organisation (ISRO) launched the advanced multi-band communication satellite GSAT-7. It was 17th Indian satellite launched from ESA with Ariane 5.
 16 October 2014 — An Ariane 5 launch vehicle carrying the communication satellite ARSAT-1 to orbit. It is the first geostationary satellite built by a Latin American country, Argentina, and the second one of the Americas, after the U.S.
 30 September 2015 — An Ariane 5 launch vehicle carrying the communication satellite ARSAT-2 to orbit, being the second Argentine geostationary satellite built in two years.
 1 October 2015 — Sky Muster (NBN-Co 1A) is a communication satellite launched on an Ariane 5 ECA launch vehicle. Sky Muster is the first satellite of an operation to improve Australia's internet with the NBN program.
 6 October 2016 — Sky Muster II (NBN-Co 1B) is a communication satellite launched on an Ariane 5 ECA launch vehicle. Sky Muster II is the second satellite of an operation to improve Australia's internet with the NBN program.
 28 January 2017 — A Soyuz-2 STB carrying the geostationary communication satellite Hispasat 36W-1 to orbit. It is the first of the ESA's "Small-GEO" class of satellites.
 14 February 2017 — An Ariane 5 launch vehicle carrying the commercial communication satellites Sky Brasil 1 (Intelsat 32e) and Telekom 3S launched the satellites to a geostationary orbit.
 25 January 2018 — Partial failure of Ariane 5 launch vehicle on Ariane flight VA241.
 19 October 2018 — An Ariane 5 launch vehicle launches the European-Japanese BepiColombo mission to Mercury.
 5 February 2019 — Ariane 5 launched the Saudi Geostationary Satellite  SGS-1 (also known as SaudiGeosat-1/HellasSat-4).
 11 July 2019 — Vega launch vehicle failed to launch Falcon Eye 1 satellite for United Arab Emirates Armed Forces.
 15 August 2020 — An Ariane 5 launched MEV-2, BSAT-4b, and Galaxy-30.
 25 December 2021 — James Webb Space Telescope.
 13 December 2022 - An Ariane 5 launched the first third generation Meteosat: Meteosat MTG-I1.

Launch statistics 

, Kourou counts amongst the spaceports with the highest percentage of successful launches, both successive and overall. Here is a chronology of all orbital launches from the Kourou spaceport since 1970, under the French and European space programmes.

Flights by launcher 

In development:
Active:
Retired:

Flights by mission outcome

Local impact

Colonialism 
The space sector was responsible for about 15% of French Guiana's GDP in 2014, around half of the 28% it was in 1990. This reduction is mostly due to expansion in other sectors, rather than decreasing space activity. As of 2020 the space sector employed 4620 people in Guiana, meaning the industry was responsible for just under 10% of salaried jobs in the territory, though there are estimates that as many as 9000 people are employed directly and indirectly as a result of activities at the spaceport. The Guiana Space Centre (or CSG) is one of the spaceports in the world that receives the most traffic, and it receives large amounts of funding from the European Space Agency (ESA), with the organisation covering around 66% of the spaceport's annual budget, as well as financing new facilities. Indigenous and local activist groups argue that mainland France is only interested in French Guiana as far as the space centre is concerned, and the funding that the space centre receives is symbolic given the inequity in living standards seen between the department and mainland France. Historically, the space centre has been referred to as its own state, and activists have accused both the French state and the space centre of colonial practices.

Decolonisation of space exploration is mostly focused on large scale efforts regarding outer space environments, however issues surrounding the Guiana Space Centre have been attributed to the continued postcolonial running of French Guiana. Proponents of this line of thinking argue that whilst the general populace may want to remain a territory of France for the benefits this entails, the negative impacts of colonialism are still being seen today, particularly in the running of the space centre. For example, despite there being high poverty levels and unemployment rates of over 20% in the department, the cost of living remains high due to a dependence on mainland France for imported food and resources, yet large amounts of funding are invested in the space programme, rather than in public services for the department.

The territory became the site of strikes and protests over the course of March and April 2017, which were held to highlight the insecurity and infrastructural issues facing French Guiana brought about by its colonial history. Alongside 30 labour unions who launched strikes, the Collective of 500 Brothers led protests in Kourou, which spread across the entire country, and resonated in mainland France. On 21 March 2017, the launch of an Ariane 5 rocket carrying a Brazilian satellite and a South Korean satellite was prevented due to protesters and workers on strike from the CSG blockading the centre. Further strikes and occupation of the space centre meant that the satellites were not launched until May 2017. Negotiations between the French government and Guianese protesters resulted in a rejection of a €1.1 billion offer made by the French, with the Guianese demanding at least €3 billion in aid. Since the protests, CNES (National Centre for Space Studies), the French government space agency that operate the spaceport, added an additional €10 million to the €40 it had already pledged to fund economic and social programmes in French Guiana. It has been said that the impact of these protests demonstrated not only the locality of the impact of colonialism, but also the vulnerability of postcolonialism in space travel to the organisation of workers and citizens.

Labour geographies 

Scholars in the field of labor geography, the study of spatial relationships in the context of employment and worker agency, have begun geographical analysis of space centres. In addition to the impacts experienced during the 2017 unrest, the CSG also experienced worker walkouts in 2011. Workers who operated the radar responsible for tracking an Ariane 5 rocket's launch into space were part of strike action organised by the Trade Union of French Guiana workers representing workers from a subcontractor of Ariane in Italy, Telespazio. This walkout prevented the scheduled launch with only 7 hours’ notice, and delayed satellite launches set to benefit the United States and the Middle East. Although workers unionising has hindered missions, it has been suggested that workers perpetuate the uneven conditions around space facilities that result from colonialism and the capitalist modes of production. Despite being negatively impacted by these uneven conditions, worker efforts to make the mundane or potentially high-stress jobs they do more enjoyable or manageable contribute to the success of the facilities and further “astro-capitalism”. At the CSG certain traditions arose in the workplace that were believed to increase chances of success, such as lighting candles at the church in Kourou when launches were taking place, or sprinkling salt in order to cultivate professional working relationships.

It has also been stressed that consideration of different intersectional identities must also occur to understand labour geographies of space centres, so that different experiences and voices can be understood in the context of the space age. Different identities impact the labour geographies of the CSG and French Guiana as a whole. Tension between workers has been seen within the space centre, where European engineers have criticised the “lack of professional commitment to labour” of the Guianese workers. Also, there is tension between workers at the facility and workers in other sectors, with there being claims that citizens must choose between working in the space centre or living in poverty. Labour geography seeks to show that space workers, such as those at the Guiana Space Centre, do not serve as a “passive appendage” to struggles around space travel and “astro-capitalism”

See also 

 French space program
 European Space Operations Centre (ESOC)
 European Space Research and Technology Centre (ESTEC)
 European Space Astronomy Centre (ESAC)
 European Astronaut Centre (EAC)
 European Centre for Space Applications and Telecommunications (ECSAT)
 ESA Centre for Earth Observation (ESRIN)
 European Space Tracking Network (ESTRACK)
 European Space Agency (ESA)
 3rd Foreign Infantry Regiment

References

External links 

  
 Soyouz in Guiana
 Europe's Spaceport  – information from ESA
 List of Stratospheric Balloons launched from CSG – information from StratoCat
 Arianespace mission status – information on current and upcoming Ariane missions; list of past missions

 
European Space Agency
Spaceports
Buildings and structures in Kourou
Rocket launch sites
Space program of France
1968 establishments in South America
1968 establishments in France